Ganeshawadi is a village in GOKAK talukaBelagavi district in the southern state of Karnataka, India.

References

Villages in Belagavi district